El Greco is a 1966 Italian drama film and biography of the painter El Greco directed by Luciano Salce and starring Mel Ferrer and Rosanna Schiaffino.

Cast
 Mel Ferrer as El Greco (Domenico Teotocopulo)
 Rosanna Schiaffino as Jeronima de las Cuevas
 Adolfo Celi as Don Miguel de las Cuevas
 Mario Feliciani as Nino de Guevara
 Franco Giacobini as Francisco
 Renzo Giovampietro as Brother Felix
 Ángel Aranda as Don Luis
 Nino Crisman as Diego de Castillo
 Gabriella Giorgelli as Maria
 Giulio Donnini as Pignatelli
 Fernando Rey as Philip II
 Rafael Rivelles as Marquis of Villena
 John Karlsen as Prosecutor
 John Francis Lane as De Agueda
 Rossana Martini as Zaida

Production
It was Mel Ferrer's first film as producer. According to Ferrer, the film cost $800,000 which he felt was modest considering the film was in color and was the first movie allowed to shoot at Toledo Cathedral.

Reception
According to Fox records, the film needed to earn $1,300,000 in rentals to break even and made $1,675,000, meaning it made a profit.

References

External links

 (4 November 1966). "Cinema: The Brush-Off", Time. Retrieved 15 December 2011.

1966 films
1966 drama films
1960s biographical drama films
Italian biographical drama films
1960s Italian-language films
Films directed by Luciano Salce
Films scored by Ennio Morricone
Biographical films about painters
Cultural depictions of El Greco
20th Century Fox films
1960s Italian films